Many North American professional sports franchises have used the same team name.  The list below are names that have been shared by two or more professional sports teams.

Format 

Name – location (sport, status)

Name refers to the team name (like Yankees).
Location refers to the city (like Boston), state/province (California), or area (New England).
Sport refers to the sports played by major professional sports leagues in the United States and Canada:
football – National Football League (1920–present), American Football League (1960–1969)
hockey – National Hockey League (1917–present), World Hockey Association (1972–1979)
baseball – Major League Baseball, including the National League (1876–present) and the American League (1901–present)
basketball – National Basketball Association (1946–present), American Basketball Association (1967–1976)
Canadian football – Canadian Football League (1958–present)
soccer – North American Soccer League (1968–1984), Major League Soccer (1996–present)

Status refers to one of five statuses of the franchise:
defunct – completely folded
moved – changed location, same name
renamed – changed name, same location
moved and renamed – changed name and location
no status listed – team name is currently active

List of currently active franchises with a shared name 
 Cardinals – Arizona (football), St. Louis (baseball)
 Giants – San Francisco (MLB baseball), New York (football)
 Jets – New York (football), Winnipeg (hockey)
 Kings – Los Angeles (hockey), Sacramento (basketball)
 Panthers – Florida (hockey), Carolina (football)
 Rangers – New York (hockey), Texas (baseball)

List of former franchises with a shared name 

Alouettes – Three separate CFL teams in Montreal, but the league considers all of the city's CFL teams to be a single franchise, now represented by the current Montreal Alouettes. 
Americans – New York (hockey, defunct), Boston (baseball, renamed), Brooklyn (hockey, defunct)
Athletics – Oakland (baseball), Kansas City (baseball, moved), Philadelphia (baseball, moved)
Blackhawks – Chicago (hockey), Tri-Cities (basketball, moved and renamed)
Blazers – Philadelphia (hockey, moved), *Vancouver (hockey, defunct), Buffalo (soccer, defunct)
Blue Jays – Toronto (baseball), Philadelphia (baseball, renamed)
Blues – St. Louis (hockey), Cleveland (baseball, defunct), Cleveland (baseball, renamed), Hartford (football, defunct), Indianapolis (baseball, defunct)
Braves – Atlanta (baseball), Boston (baseball, moved), Milwaukee (baseball, moved), Buffalo (basketball, moved and renamed), Boston (football, moved)
Brewers – Milwaukee (baseball), Milwaukee (baseball, defunct)
Browns – Cleveland (football), Cleveland (football, moved and renamed), St. Louis (baseball, renamed), St. Louis (baseball, moved and renamed)
 Although the Baltimore Ravens are the corporate successor to the first team that played as the Cleveland Browns, the NFL treats the Ravens as a completely separate franchise from the Browns, and considers the current Browns as heirs to the history of the original Browns. See Cleveland Browns relocation controversy for more details. 
Buccaneers – Tampa Bay (football), Los Angeles (football, defunct), New Orleans (basketball, defunct)
Bulldogs – Canton (football, defunct), Cleveland (football, defunct), New York (football, defunct), Quebec (hockey, defunct)
Bullets – Washington (basketball, renamed), Baltimore (basketball, moved), Capital (basketball, "moved"), Baltimore (basketball, defunct)
 In the case of the Capital Bullets, "moved" is placed in quotes because the team abandoned the name due to a rebranding, not a physical move. The Bullets adopted the "Capital" name for the 1973–74 season after leaving Baltimore for the immediate Washington area. In that season, they played their first few home games at Cole Field House on the University of Maryland campus in College Park before their new home, the Capital Centre in Landover, Maryland, opened in December 1973. Beginning with the 1974–75 season, the team changed its name to the Washington Bullets, but remained at Capital Centre.
Bulls – Chicago (basketball), Birmingham (hockey, defunct), Jacksonville (football, defunct)
Cardinals – Arizona (football), St. Louis (baseball), St. Louis (football, moved), Chicago (football, moved)
Chargers – Los Angeles (football, moved and later returned), San Diego (football, moved)
Clippers – Los Angeles (basketball), San Diego (basketball, moved)
Colonels – Louisville (baseball, defunct), Louisville (football, defunct), Kentucky (basketball, defunct)
Colts – Indianapolis (football), Baltimore (football, moved), Chicago (baseball, renamed), Baltimore (football, defunct)
Commanders – Washington (football)
Cowboys – Dallas (football), Kansas City (Union Association baseball, defunct), Kansas City (National League baseball, defunct), Kansas City (American Association baseball, defunct), Calgary (hockey, defunct)
Dodgers – Los Angeles (baseball), Brooklyn (baseball, moved), Brooklyn (football, renamed)
Eagles – Philadelphia (football), St. Louis (hockey, defunct)
Earthquakes – San Jose (soccer), San Jose (soccer, defunct)
Falcons – Atlanta (football), Detroit (basketball, defunct), Detroit (hockey, renamed)
Flames – Calgary (hockey), Atlanta (hockey, moved)
Flyers – Philadelphia (hockey), Muncie (football, defunct)
Giants – San Francisco (baseball), New York (football), New York (baseball, moved)
Grays – Louisville (baseball, defunct), Milwaukee (baseball, defunct), Providence (baseball, defunct)
Grizzlies – Memphis (basketball), Vancouver (basketball, moved)
Hawks – Atlanta (basketball), Milwaukee (basketball, moved), St. Louis (basketball, moved), Waterloo (basketball, defunct)
Hornets – Charlotte (basketball), New Orleans (basketball, renamed), New Orleans/Oklahoma City (basketball, temporary move)
 The team now known as the New Orleans Pelicans is the corporate successor to the first NBA team that played in Charlotte. However, the NBA considers the current Charlotte Hornets to be heirs to the history of the original Charlotte Hornets prior to their relocation to New Orleans in 2002. The NBA credits the Pelicans with the history of the New Orleans Hornets, including their temporary stint in Oklahoma City in the aftermath of Hurricane Katrina.   
Indians – Cleveland (baseball, renamed), Akron (football, defunct), Oorang (football, defunct), Cleveland (football, defunct)
Jazz – Utah (basketball), New Orleans (basketball, moved)
Jets – New York (football), Winnipeg (hockey, moved and renamed), Indianapolis (basketball, defunct), Winnipeg (hockey)
Kings – Los Angeles (hockey), Sacramento (basketball), Kansas City (basketball, moved), Kansas City/Omaha (basketball, suspended Omaha operations)
Lakers – Los Angeles (basketball), Minneapolis (basketball, moved)
Lions – Detroit (football), British Columbia (Canadian football), Brooklyn (football, defunct)
Mariners – Seattle (baseball), San Diego (hockey, defunct)
Maroons – Montreal (hockey, defunct), Toledo (football, moved), Kenosha (football, defunct), Pottsville (football, defunct), St. Louis (baseball, defunct)
Nationals – Washington (baseball), Syracuse (basketball, moved and renamed), Washington (baseball, renamed and later moved), Washington (baseball, defunct), Ottawa (hockey, defunct)
 The American League baseball team that played in Washington, D.C. from 1901 to 1960, now the Minnesota Twins, was actually officially known as the Nationals for the bulk of its tenure in the city. The team's owners changed the name from Senators to Nationals after a 1904 season in which they went 39–113. However, fans and journalists used the "Nationals" and "Senators" names interchangeably. The "Senators" name officially returned in 1956.
Nets – Brooklyn (basketball), New Jersey (basketball, moved), New York (basketball, moved)
Nuggets – Denver (basketball), Denver (basketball, defunct)
Oilers – Edmonton (hockey), Alberta (hockey, "moved"), Houston (football, moved), Tennessee (football, renamed)
 The situation with the Alberta Oilers is similar to that of the Capital Bullets in that the team changed its geographic designation due to a rebranding and not a physical move. The franchise was founded in 1971 as the Edmonton Oilers, alongside a Calgary franchise known as the Broncos. However, before the WHA's inaugural season in 1972–73, the Broncos' owner died, and the new owners moved the team to Cleveland. The Oilers then began play as the Alberta Oilers, intending to split home games between Edmonton and Calgary, but never played a game in Calgary. The team reverted to the Edmonton Oilers name in 1973–74.
Orioles – Multiple teams from Baltimore; see Baltimore Oriole (disambiguation)
Packers – Green Bay (football), Anderson (basketball, defunct), Chicago (basketball, renamed)
Panthers – Florida (hockey), Carolina (football), Detroit (football, defunct)
Patriots – New England (football), Boston (football, moved)
Pirates – Pittsburgh (baseball), Pittsburgh (hockey, defunct), Pittsburgh (football, changed name to Steelers in 1940)
Pistons – Detroit (basketball), Fort Wayne (basketball, moved)
Pros – Akron (football, renamed), Syracuse (football, defunct)
Quakers – Philadelphia (hockey, defunct), Philadelphia (baseball, renamed)
Raiders – Las Vegas (football), Oakland (football, moved), Los Angeles (football, moved), New York (hockey, defunct)
Rams – Los Angeles (football, moved, returned 2016)St. Louis (football, moved), Cleveland (football, moved), 
Rangers – New York (hockey), Texas (baseball)
Reds – Cincinnati (baseball), Cincinnati (football, defunct), Cincinnati (baseball, defunct)
Redskins – Washington (football, renamed), Boston (football, moved), Sheboygan (basketball, defunct)
Rockets – Houston (basketball), San Diego (basketball, moved), Denver (basketball, renamed)
Rockies – Colorado (baseball), Colorado (hockey, defunct)
Royals – Kansas City (baseball), Rochester (basketball, renamed), Cincinnati (basketball, moved)
Senators – Ottawa (hockey), Washington (baseball, defunct), Washington (baseball, moved and renamed), Washington (baseball, moved and renamed), Washington (football, defunct), Ottawa (hockey, reverted to amateur status and now defunct)
Sharks – San Jose (hockey), Los Angeles (hockey, defunct)
Sounders – Seattle (soccer), Seattle (soccer, defunct)
Spurs – San Antonio (basketball), Calgary (hockey, defunct)
Stars – Dallas (hockey), Syracuse (baseball, defunct), Utah (basketball, defunct), Philadelphia (USFL football)
Texans – Houston (football), Dallas (AFL football, moved and renamed), Dallas (NFL football, defunct), San Antonio (Canadian football, defunct)
Titans – Tennessee (football), New York (football, renamed)
Timbers – Portland (soccer), Portland (soccer, defunct)
Tigers – Detroit (baseball), Hamilton (hockey, defunct), Chicago (football, defunct), Columbus (football, defunct), Brooklyn (football, defunct)
Tornados – Orange (football, defunct), Racine (football, defunct)
Warriors – Golden State (basketball), Philadelphia (basketball, moved), San Francisco (basketball, renamed)
Whalers – New England (hockey, moved), Hartford (hockey, moved and renamed)
Whitecaps – Vancouver (soccer), Vancouver (soccer, defunct)
Wizards – Washington (basketball), Kansas City (soccer, renamed)
Yankees – New York (baseball), New York (multiple football teams, all defunct)

Canada sport-related lists
United States sport-related lists